The American Music Award for Favorite Album – Rap/Hip Hop has been awarded since 1989. Years reflect in the year in which the awards were presented, for works released in the previous year (until 2003 onward where awards were handed out on November of the same year). Drake has the most nominations with 9.

Winners and nominees

1980s

1990s

2000s

2010s

2020s

Category facts

Multiple wins

 3 wins
 Nicki Minaj

 2 wins
 50 Cent
 DJ Jazzy Jeff & The Fresh Prince
 Eminem
 MC Hammer
 Post Malone
 Kendrick Lamar

Multiple nominations

 9 nominations
 Drake

 7 nominations
 Eminem

 5 nominations
 Jay-Z

 4 nominations
 T.I.

 3 nominations
 Kendrick Lamar
 Nicki Minaj
 Public Enemy
 Kanye West

 2 nominations
 Post Malone
 50 Cent
 J. Cole
 DJ Jazzy Jeff & The Fresh Prince
 Future
 Lil Uzi Vert
 Lil Wayne
 MC Hammer

References

American Music Awards
Hip hop awards
Awards established in 1989
1989 establishments in the United States
Awards established in 2003
Awards disestablished in 1992
Album awards